The Gettysburg Springs Hotel was a Gettysburg Battlefield tourist site in the area of the first day of combat. The hotel was on the east side of Herr Ridge at the western terminus of the Gettysburg Spring Railroad and near the Katalysine Springs.

History
The hotel company was incorporated by the Commonwealth as the "Battle House and Mineral Springs Watering Place Company at Gettysburg" on April 12, 1867. Construction of the "Watering Place Hotel" began in 1868 and the hotel opened on June 28, 1869. A lease dispute in April 1869 between the proprietor and the New York and Gettysburg Spring Company resulted in a "forcible entry" at the bottling plant. However, the conflict was resolved in time for the hotel to host the first Gettysburg reunion. The hotel also hosted officers from the Battle of Gettysburg in 1882 for John B. Bachelder's survey of the battlefield.

The hotel company went bankrupt in 1901. On December 24, 1904, the receivers of the hotel transferred land east of the hotel to the United States Department of War. This transfer allowed the railbed and wagon road on McPherson Ridge's west slope to be finished using methods pioneered by Thomas Telford. The area became the commemorative era Meredith Avenue. Additional Gettysburg Springs & Hotel tracts were transferred to the War Department in June 1907 and December 1913. The 1913 transfer included an area near the field of Pickett's Charge.

The hotel was destroyed by a December 1917 fire. The land that was privately owned became part of the Gettysburg Country Club golf course, until purchased by the National Park Service in 2011.

References

Hotel buildings completed in 1869
Burned hotels in the United States
Demolished hotels in the United States
Defunct companies based in Pennsylvania
1913 disestablishments in Pennsylvania
1917 fires in the United States
Hotels established in 1867
Hotels in Pennsylvania
1867 establishments in Pennsylvania
Buildings and structures demolished in 1917